Art by Women in Florence: A Guide through Five Hundred Years is a 2012 book written by Jane Fortune and Linda Falcone through The Advancing Women Artists Foundation and published by The Florentine Press. Art by Women in Florence is adapted from the book Invisible Women: Forgotten Artists of Florence as a pocket-size guidebook through Florence's museums showcasing over eighty paintings and sculptures by more than sixty women artists.

Proceeds derived from Art by Women in Florence support projects sponsored by the Advancing Women Artists Foundation in their work to research, restore, and exhibit artwork by women in Florence's museums and storehouses.

Description 
Art by Women in Florence: A Guide through Five Hundred Years is divided into eight sections, including a brief segment on unexhibited paintings, and provides a fold-out map of Florence delineating twenty locations housing viewable artwork.  (See full list below.)

The book points to a number of religious paintings in Florence's churches including works by Suor Plautilla Nelli, the city's first known woman artist (2) such as her Lamentation with Saints in the San Marco Museum. Visitors to Santa Maria del Carmine will find a burial monument by Félice de Fauveau, considered to be one of the most preeminent marble sculptures of the nineteenth century. Art by Women in Florence spotlights Artemisia Gentileschi, a seventeenth-century Baroque master known to depict historical and mythical heroines. A significant portion of the guide showcases self-portraiture in the Vasari Corridor. These protagonists include the wildly popular Angelica Kauffmann whose work inspired designs for high-class housewares at the peak of the Industrial Revolution and Cecilia Beaux the earliest American invited to contribute to the Corridor's self-portrait collection. (2) Art by Women in Florence guides the reader to the outskirts of Florence to explore various Medici villas hosting works by numerous women including Lavinia Fontana, the first female painter to receive a public commission in Italy, and seventeenth-century court artist Giovanna Fratellini.

Locations listed on the Map 
 Santa Maria del Fiore (the Duomo)
 Casa Buonarroti
 Santa Croce
 Uffizi Gallery
 Print and Drawings Collection
 Vasari Corridor
 Palatine Gallery
 Gallery of Modern Art
 Silver Museum
 Gabinetto S. L. G. P. Viesseux
 Santa Maria del Carmine
 Santa Maria Novella
 Proc. Gen. Repubblica
 Oblate Gallery
 Santa Maria Maddalena dei Pazzi
 Accademia Gallery
 Marucelliana Library
 San Marco Museum
 Innocenti Museum
 S. Salvi Museum

References 

2012 non-fiction books
Art history books
Case studies
History books about Florence
Italian women painters